Assam Women's University is a public university located in Jorhat, Assam, India.  It was established by the Assam Women's University Act, 2013 (XXII of 2013) by the Assam Government. It is the first women's university in Assam.

During the initial set up Assam Agricultural University Vice-Chancellor was appointed as the mentor of the university by the state government.

On 12 September 2019, the Governor of Assam and chancellor of the university Jagdish Mukhi appointed Malinee Goswami as the first vice chancellor of the university.

Academics 
The university offers undergraduate, postgraduate, and research programs in various disciplines such as Arts, Science, Commerce, Management, Social Work, and Education. Some of the popular courses offered by AWU are BA, B.Sc, B.Com, BBA, MBA, MCA, M.Sc, MA, M.Ed, and Ph.D. The university follows a semester system for all its courses.

References

External links 

Education in Jorhat district
Women's universities and colleges in Assam
2013 establishments in Assam
Educational institutions established in 2013
Jorhat
State universities in Assam